V. laeta may refer to:

 Venus laeta, a saltwater clam
 Veronica laeta, a bird's eye
 Virbia laeta, a Northern American moth